Dalgopol (also transliterated Dǎlgopol) is a town in northeastern Bulgaria, part of Varna Province. It is the administrative centre of Dalgopol Municipality, which lies in the southwestern part of the Province. As of December 2009, the town has a population of 4,829 inhabitants.

Dalgopol lies 70 kilometres west of the provincial capital of Varna, near the Tsonevo Reservoir, in the eastern part of the Varbitsa Balkan Mountains.

Municipality

Dalgopol municipality has an area of 442 square kilometres and includes the following 16 places:

Honour
Dalgopol Glacier on Smith Island, South Shetland Islands is named after Dalgopol.

References

External links
 Dalgopol municipality website 

Towns in Bulgaria
Populated places in Varna Province